Ragnar Kjartansson (born 1976) is a contemporary Icelandic artist who engages multiple artistic mediums throughout his performative practice. His video installations, performances, drawings, and paintings incorporate the history of film, music, visual culture, and literature. His works are connected through their pathos and humor, with each deeply influenced by the comedy and tragedy of classical theater. Kjartansson's use of durational, repetitive performance to harness collective emotion is a hallmark of his practice and recurs throughout his work.

Kjartansson has had solo exhibitions at the Reykjavík Art Museum, the Barbican Centre, London, the Hirshhorn Museum and Sculpture Garden, Washington D.C., the Musée d'art contemporain de Montréal, the Palais de Tokyo, Paris, the New Museum, New York, the Migros Museum of Contemporary Art, Zurich, the Fondazione Sandretto Re Rebaudengo, Turin, the Frankfurter Kunstverein, and the BAWAG Contemporary, Vienna.  Kjartansson participated in The Encyclopedic Palace at the Venice Biennale in 2013, Manifesta 10 in St. Petersburg, Russia in 2014, and he represented Iceland at the 2009 Venice Biennale. He is the recipient of the 2015 Artes Mundi's Derek Williams Trust Purchase Award, and Performa's 2011 Malcolm McLaren Award.

Early life
Kjartansson was born in Reykjavik, Iceland to Kjartan Ragnarsson and Guðrún Ásmundsdóttir. His mother is a well-known actress in Iceland and his father is a director and playwright.

He was in and out of bands growing up, most notably as a member of the Icelandic band Trabant. Trabant is an electronic-pop/rock band from Reykjavík, Iceland, known for its raw but powerful music and flamboyant live performances. Trabant's style of music is a blend of electronic music, punk, R&B and pop.

Kjartansson graduated from the Iceland Academy of the Arts in 2001 and from the Royal Academy of Arts in Stockholm in 2000.

Selected works and projects

A Lot of Sorrow
MoMA PS1 presented the durational performance, A Lot of Sorrow, by Kjartansson on 5 May 2013.

The Visitors 
The Visitors is a 2012 installation and video art piece created by Kjartansson. Kjartansson named the piece for The Visitors, the final album by the Swedish pop band ABBA. The piece was commissioned by the Migros Museum in Zurich, and was one of the museum's inaugural exhibits. The premiere of the piece marked Kjartansson's first solo show in Switzerland.

The Visitors constitutes the performance of a song written by Ásdís Sif Gunnarsdóttir, Kjartansson's ex-wife. The piece is displayed across nine different screens, each featuring musicians or artists either by themselves or in groups in different rooms of a house, or outside, performing simultaneously but separately. One screen features Kjartansson by himself. Others featured in the piece include friends of Kjartansson, both from the artist's native Reykjavík and elsewhere, as well as residents of Rokeby Farm, where the piece was filmed.

The piece was originally shown at the Migros Museum in Switzerland, and premiered in the United States in early 2013 at the Luhring Augustine Gallery. The piece has since been displayed in several museums around the world, including The Broad in Los Angeles, The Guggenheim in New York City, the Institute of Contemporary Art in Boston, the Turner House Gallery in Penarth, the Hirshhorn Museum and Sculpture Garden in Washington, D.C., the Frist Center for the Visual Arts in Nashville, Tennessee, and the San Francisco Museum of Modern Art. The piece returned to the Institute of Contemporary Art in February 2019. The piece came to the Dallas Museum of Art in September 2019.

The piece was filmed at Rokeby Farm, located in upstate New York, near Barrytown. Rokeby is a home and estate that at one point belonged to the Astor family, and later the Livingston family. The property is now inhabited by various descendants of both families, and other tenants. The property was the site of an earlier 2007 piece by Kjartansson, titled The Blossoming Trees Performance, during which he recorded himself as a plein-air painter for two days. The estate has also been used by other artists, due to the unique interiors of the main house on the property.

The Palace of the Summerland 
In 2014, Thyssen-Bornemisza Art Contemporary (TBA21) commissioned Kjartansson and a group of 20 artists, musicians, and friends to create the two-part project The Palace of the Summerland.

The End 
In 2009, Kjartansson was selected as the official Icelandic representation at the 53rd International Art Exhibition – La Biennale di Venezia.

Recognition 
In 2016, Kjartansson was honored as the year's Reykjavik City Artist. This is an honorary award, given to an artist who is believed to have excelled and made his mark on Icelandic art.

Literature 
Ragnar Kjartansson: The End, Christian Schoen (ed.), Ostfildern (Hatje Cantz) 2009, 
 Icelandic Art Today (ed. by Christian Schoen and Halldór Björn Runólfsson), Hatje-Cantz, Ostfildern 2009

References

Ragnar Kjartansson
Living people
Ragnar Kjartansson
Ragnar Kjartansson
1976 births
Icelandic contemporary artists
Multimedia artists